Several Formula Ford racing cars have been designed or built in Canada.

References

Motorsport in Canada
Canadian racecar constructors